Buddhist Institute may refer to:

Buddhist Institute, Cambodia
Karmapa International Buddhist Institute
Institute of Buddhist Studies
Malaysian Buddhist Institute
Nalanda Buddhist Institute, Bhutan
Namgyal Monastery Institute of Buddhist Studies
Central Institute of Buddhist Studies
International Buddhist Academy
Larung Gar Buddhist Academy
Soka Gakkai Italian Buddhist Institute
Barua Buddhist Institutes in India and Bangladesh

See also
Buddhist studies
List of Buddhist universities and colleges